Ruslan Kudayev (born 8 May 1980 in Andijan Province) is an Uzbekistani fencer. 

He qualified in men's épée at the 2012 Summer Olympics as one of the three top finishers of the Asia-Oceania qualifying tournament. He defeated South Korea's Park Kyoung-doo in the table of 32, but lost to Venezuela's Silvio Fernández in the next round.

References

1980 births
Living people
Uzbekistani male épée fencers
Olympic fencers of Uzbekistan
Fencers at the 2012 Summer Olympics
Fencers at the 2002 Asian Games
Fencers at the 2006 Asian Games
Fencers at the 2010 Asian Games
Fencers at the 2014 Asian Games
Asian Games competitors for Uzbekistan
20th-century Uzbekistani people
21st-century Uzbekistani people